Walter Beck (born 20 November 1907, date of death unknown) was a Swiss gymnast who competed in the 1936 Summer Olympics.

References

1907 births
Year of death missing
Swiss male artistic gymnasts
Olympic gymnasts of Switzerland
Gymnasts at the 1936 Summer Olympics
Olympic silver medalists for Switzerland
Olympic medalists in gymnastics
Medalists at the 1936 Summer Olympics